Arthur Olliver (10 December 1916 – 31 May 1988) was an Australian rules footballer in the (then) Victorian Football League (VFL), and coached successfully in the then Western Australian National Football League (WANFL).

A champion Footscray ruckman over 16 years with the club, Olliver held the games record for the Bulldogs prior to Ted Whitten. In seven seasons as captain-coach Olliver got the Bulldogs into the finals three times, and saw them narrowly miss out twice.

One of Footscray's longest serving players, Olliver played 272 VFL games and kicked 354 goals for the club. Olliver was appointed captain-coach of New Norfolk in Tasmania, where he stayed for three years. In 1951 he won his club's best and fairest award, and captain-coached the Tasmanian state team.  Olliver's last involvement in top-level football was as non-playing coach of West Perth Football Club in the WANFL between 1960 and 1963. In his first season, the Cardinals won their first WANFL premiership for nine seasons, but they were not able to keep up this form, finishing fifth, third and fifth in an eight-club competition for his final three seasons.

In 2003 Olliver was inducted into the Australian Football Hall of Fame.  He has also been inducted into the Footscray/Western Bulldogs Hall of Fame and was named on the interchange in their Team of the Century.

References

External links
 
 AFL: Hall of Fame

1916 births
1988 deaths
Western Bulldogs players
Western Bulldogs coaches
Australian Football Hall of Fame inductees
Charles Sutton Medal winners
New Norfolk Football Club players
New Norfolk Football Club coaches
West Perth Football Club coaches
Australian rules footballers from Melbourne
People from Footscray, Victoria